Magic Tour may refer to a concert tour by:

  Magic Tour (Queen)
  Magic Tour (Bruce Springsteen)